William Paxton may refer to:

Politicians
 William F. Paxton (born 1946), American politician from Kentucky
 William A. Paxton (1837–1907), American politician and businessman from Nebraska
 Sir William Paxton (British businessman) (1744–1824), British MP and businessman
 William T. Paxton (1869–1942), American politician in the Virginia Senate

Others
 William Paxton (Australian businessman) (1818–1893), pharmacist and investor in South Australia
 William Paxton (musician) (1737–1781), English cellist
 William McGregor Paxton (1869–1941), American painter
 Bill Paxton (1955–2017), American actor and director
 Bill Paxton (computer scientist)

See also
 Bill Paxon (born 1954)